Fujiwara no Tomoie (藤原知家 1182 - 1258) was a waka poet and Japanese nobleman active in the Heian period and early Kamakura period. He was also known as Renshō (蓮性). He was the elder brother of Fujiwara no Akiuji.

References

Citations

Works cited

External links 
E-text of his poems in Japanese

Japanese poets
Fujiwara clan
1182 deaths
1258 deaths